Jurečka (feminine Jurečková) is a Czech surname. Notable people with the surname include:

 Alexandr Jurečka (1990–2015), Czech judoka
 Jana Jurečková (born 1940), Czech statistician
 Marian Jurečka (born 1981), Czech politician
 Václav Jurečka (born 1994), Czech footballer

See also
 

Czech-language surnames